The Obie Award for Distinguished Performance by an Actress was first presented in 1956. The award has no nominees and there is no set number of winners per year. Each performance listed by year below was given an award and they are listed in no particular order. The award can be for a lead or supporting performance and in a play or musical. On occasion, the Obie Awards committee will give an actress an award for sustained excellence of performance to recognize their contributions to Off-Broadway theatre. There is also a separate ensemble award given to recognize entire casts without singling out a particular performer, as they have below. On occasion, the committee gives an actress an award for sustained lifetime achievement, listings for which are also included below. The Obie Award is for performances Off-Broadway and Off-Off-Broadway in New York City only, and is one of the most respected theatre awards given in the United States. In 2014, Sydney Lucas became the youngest winner in OBIE history, at age 10.
‡ – indicates the performance was also nominated for the Tony Award after transferring to Broadway.

1950s

1960s

1970s

1980s

1990s

2000s

2010s

Winners of more than one award

3 Wins
Gloria Foster
Marian Seldes
Ruth Maleczech
Swoosie Kurtz
Elizabeth Wilson
Laurie Metcalf
Lola Pashalinski
Elizabeth Marvel
Rosemary Harris
Frances Sternhagen

2 Wins
April Mathis
Cherise Booth
Viola Davis
Dianne Wiest
Deirdre O'Connell
Cherry Jones
Kathleen Widdoes
Nancy Marchand
Peggy Shaw
Alice Playten
Irene Worth
Charlayne Woodard
Kristine Nielsen
Joan MacIntosh
S. Epatha Merkerson
Linda Lavin
Anna Deavere Smith
Eileen Atkins
Mary Louise Wilson
Karen Evans-Kandel
Nancy Wickwire
Priscilla Smith
Mari Gorman
Anne Meacham
Estelle Parsons
Pamela Payton-Wright
Lois Smith
Roberta Maxwell
Sada Thompson
Dana Ivey 
Lynne Thigpen
Kathleen Chalfant 
Mary-Louise Parker
Julie Bovasso
Lisa Gay Hamilton
Jayne Houdyshell

References

External links 

Actress
Awards established in 1956
1956 establishments in New York City
Awards for actresses